Blake Johnson is an American farmer and politician serving in the Arkansas Senate from the 20th district. He won the seat after defeating Democrat incumbent Robert F. Thompson 53.8% to 46.2%, flipping the district from Democratic to Republican. He and fellow state senator Dan Sullivan swapped districts before the 2022 elections, and Johnson ran for third term in the 21st district.

References

21st-century American politicians
Arkansas Republicans
Living people
Year of birth missing (living people)